vocaldente are an a cappella quintet from Hanover, Germany.

History
vocaldente were founded in 2004 by five singers - Tobias "Tobek" Kiel (1st tenor), Johannes "Johnny" Gruber (baritone / mouth percussion) Niklas Turmann (2nd tenor), Ansgar Pfeiffer (countertenor), and Arndt Schmöle (bass). The group primarily emerged from the Knabenchor Hannover (Hanover Boys Choir) and the Hanover University of Music and Drama. Their line-up has altered three times, in 2006, when Tobias Pasternack, né Wunschik replaced Schmöle, in 2008, when Michael Schöpe was recruited in place of the departing Turmann and in 2009 when Timo Klemm came in for Pfeiffer who retired. 2011 Christoph Grasse joined as new Countertenor and Jakob Buch as 2nd Tenor. Schmöle, Schöpe, Klemm and Turman left to pursue new musical challenges.

The ensemble began by building their support base locally and then began to perform across Germany. By 2007, they were frequently undertaking foreign tours, most notably to the United States and South East Asia, where they've been continuously building up a loyal and enthused following of fans ever since. In 2007 and 2008, they won first prizes at several renowned international A cappella competitions such as the Tampereen Sävel Contest for Vocal Ensembles in Finland and the Harmony Sweepstakes A Cappella Festival in the U.S.

The band performed a special concert in the Balver Caves in 2009, celebrating the 5th anniversary of their formation. A DVD of this concert is planned for release in Autumn 2009.

Influences
Due to their varied musical backgrounds and instrumental professions, vocaldente cite many different musical influences. As a vocal group, they're most notably influenced by pioneering British a cappella ensemble the King's Singers, in whose workshops at the Schleswig-Holstein Musik Festival they've already participated twice, where they were honoured by some commending remarks from members of the King's Singers.

Repertoire
The ensemble performs a varied catalogue of popular songs covering contemporary and modern music from the past 100 years, as well as its own compositions. All songs are arranged by members of the group themselves. When performing, vocaldente put great emphasis on singing acoustically without technical aids or microphones, as they consider this method as returning “back to the roots of a cappella”.

Workshop
In the last few years, vocaldente has dedicated its time more and more to pedagogical work with children, teens, and adults,  individuals and ensembles, school classes and choirs.  With alumni from the Hochschule für Musik, Theater, und Medien Hannover, the Hochschule für Musik und Theater Leipzig, as well as the Universität Hildesheim in the fields of High School instruction for music, culture, as well as vocal pedagogy in their own field, vocaldente has collected valuable experience among the musically motivated.

The internationally acclaimed, professional vocal ensemble represents as the Godparent for the natural art of creating music:  singing in a group without amplification or technological tricks – to work solely with the sound of one's own voice.

vocaldente has, over the past few years,  developed different concepts for workshops based on various themes such as voice, vocal sound, phrasing, breath technique, group- and choir singing, rhythm and voice, instrumental imitation, mouth percussion, intonation, blending, groove, staging/stagecraft, presentation, microphones, and marketing. The emphasis of these hands-on courses lies, respective of the workshop group, in the basic goals, such as the discovery of the voice as an instrument, singing together as an ensemble, up to complex material like layered patterns, group sound, and polishing the performance art.

Discography
All recordings are released independently by vocaldente, and are only sold through their official website or at their concerts. The group recorded all in studios in Hanover, Germany.

Albums
	"Let’s Misbehave" (2006)
	"gold 'n' delicious" (2009)
	"Life Is A Highway" (2016)
	"In The Air" (2020)

Singles
	"...dann ist Sommer" (2007)

DVDs
	"Live at Balver Caves" (scheduled for release in Autumn 2009)

Awards
	1st Prize - Tampereen Sävel 2007 (Tampere, Finland)
	1st Prize - Harmony Sweepstakes A Cappella Festival 2008 (San Francisco, USA)
	1st Prize - Taiwan International Contemporary A Cappella Competition 2008 (Taipei)

References

External links
Official website
vocaldente on MySpace

Professional a cappella groups